"Planets of the Universe" is a song by American singer/songwriter Stevie Nicks. The song was first recorded as a demo during the recording sessions for the 1977 Fleetwood Mac album, Rumours, and this demo was included on the 2-disc Rumours expanded re-release in 2004. The song earned Nicks a nomination for the Grammy Award for Best Female Rock Vocal Performance.

In 2001, Nicks released an edited version of the song (omitting almost 2 minutes of material) on her solo album Trouble in Shangri-La, having recorded a completely new full-length version in 2000.

"Planets of the Universe" was a number-one hit on the U.S. Hot Dance Club Play chart in August 2001.

The song was featured on the tv show Charmed.

Track listing
The song was released on 2 CD singles, one of which was a 6-track maxi-single with dance remixes and the full-length, unedited 2000 version. A double 12-inch vinyl set was also issued as a limited edition in the US and featured the track listing of the CD maxi-single. Both physical CD singles and the 12-inch vinyl release are no longer available from Reprise Records.

2-track single
 "Planets of the Universe" (Radio Edit) – 4:21
 "Planets of the Universe" (Album Version) – 4:46

6-track maxi-single / Double 12-inch vinyl
 "Planets of the Universe" (Tracy Young Club Mix) – 10:27
 "Planets of the Universe" (Tracy Young Universal Dub) – 8:08
 "Planets of the Universe" (Illicit Club Mix) – 7:49
 "Planets of the Universe" (Illicit Vocal Dub) – 7:32
 "Planets of the Universe" (Illicit Vocal Dub Instrumental) – 7:27
 "Planets of the Universe" (Extended Album Version) – 6:35

Note: The 'Extended Album Version' is a misnomer, as it is actually the full-length, unedited, newly recorded, 2000 version, including extra lyrics and coda, previously only demoed in the 1976 Rumours sessions with Fleetwood Mac.

Personnel
Stevie Nicks – vocals, keyboards, percussion
Sharon Celani – backing vocals
Lori Nicks – backing vocals
Steve Ferrone – drums
John Shanks – guitars, bass

Charts

See also
 List of number-one dance singles of 2001 (U.S.)

References

2001 singles
Stevie Nicks songs
Songs written by Stevie Nicks
Song recordings produced by John Shanks
2000 songs
Reprise Records singles